Occupational inequality is the unequal treatment of people based on gender, sexuality, height, weight, accent, or race in the workplace. When researchers study trends in occupational inequality they usually focus on distribution or allocation pattern of groups across occupations, for example, the distribution of men compared to women in a certain occupation. Secondly, they focus on the link between occupation and income, for example, comparing the income of whites with blacks in the same occupation.

Effects
Occupational inequality greatly affects the socioeconomic status of an individual which is linked with their access to resources like finding a job, buying a house, etc. If an individual experiences occupational inequality, it may be more difficult for them to find a job, advance in their job, get a loan or buy a house. Occupational standing can lead to predictions of outcomes such as social standing and wealth which have long-lasting effects on the individual as well as their dependants. Segregation by gender in the labor force is extremely high, hence the reason why there remain so many disparities and inequalities among men and women of equitable qualifications. The division of labor is a central feature for gender based inequality. It influences the structure both based on its economic aspects and construction of identities. However, studies show that the general overall picture of gender and labor has not been evaluated. The importance of these issues is pertinent for the future structure of our labor force.

History
The enactment of federal equal employment opportunity (EEO) laws were passed in the 1960s to enforce equal employment opportunities and to eradicate past discrimination against women and minority men in the workplace. In the 1960s and 1970s, the US saw a tremendous decrease in occupational inequality; however, in the 1980s and 1990s, it began to rise again.

Theories
Occupational inequality has historically always been a problem, but could diminish over time, according to Richard A. Miech, who attributes this potential change to economic theory. He determines that race and sex discrimination is inefficient in a competitive world because it calls for only white men to be employed. White men, however, will demand a higher salary than women or people of other races who have the same education and abilities, thus discriminating employers lose more money. Non-discriminating employers can gain an edge in the competitive market by hiring women and minorities, thereby reducing occupational inequality. This plan, if taken on by employers, could perpetuate over time to other employers in which occupational inequality could decrease nationally. Other theories and research suggests occupational inequality is increasing and will continue to do so.

According to the process of "aging effects", occupational inequality will continue with advancing age. According to this theory, the labor market consists of two sectors of jobs; one is the "primary" core of good jobs with good working conditions, advancement opportunities and job safety. The other is the "peripheral" sector of bad jobs with bad working conditions, low advancement opportunities and little job safety. Mobility between these two groups is very difficult. Women and minorities are disproportionately placed into the peripheral sector early on in their careers with little chance of moving into the primary group to achieve equal occupational status.

The theory of "homosocial reproduction" points to a trend where those in high position tend to pick the employees who have similar social backgrounds as their own for advancement. Since the majority of managers are men, women are less chosen for career advancement and thus occupational inequality increases.

Measurement
The Duncan Socioeconomic Index (SEI) has been most commonly used to measure Occupational Status. It is based on two factors, occupational earnings and occupational education.

One way occupational inequality is measured is by the index of dissimilarity (D). The equation is as follows:

D=½εi|Xi-Yi|

where Xi equals the percent of race or sex group X in the labor force in occupation i and Yi equals the percent of race or sex group Y in occupation i. D is the measure of one half the sum of the absolute difference between the percentage distributions. The values range from 0 to 100 and measures the relative separation or integration of groups across an area. If the value equals 0% it means the area is distributed evenly. If the value is 100% it means the area is completely segregated. If the value is 60%, for example, it means 60% of workers would have to change occupations to make the distributions equal.

Occupational segregation
Occupational inequality is often linked with occupational segregation in a work place. The greater the segregation in a workplace, the greater the occupational inequality. This is true specifically for jobs dominated by a certain minority or women. They often have bad work environments and less income than white males who usually make up the managerial positions with better work environments and more pay.

Gender inequality
Some common inequalities that take place in the workplace are the gender-based imbalances of individuals in power and command over the management of the organization. Women are not able to move up into higher paid positions as quickly as men. Some organizations have more inequality than others, and the extent to which it occurs can differ greatly. In the workplace the men usually hold the higher positions and the women often hold lower paid positions such as secretaries. Gender inequality can also be understood when looking at transgender workers. Workers have different experiences when transitioning at the workplace. Power that was held previously can be lost when transitioning to a woman while workers transitioning to a man can experience a power gain.

Racial inequality

Ethnicity has a large influence on the quality of jobs as well as the amount of money an individual will make in the workforce. Today, African American men working full-time and year-round have 72 percent of the average earnings of comparable white men. Between African American and white women, the wage ratio is 85 percent. The black unemployment rate is typically at about double the rate among white people. White men have many substantial advantages in the workplace. They are offered a larger variety of job opportunities. The positions that earn the most money and have the most power are usually occupied by white men. Though this type of inequality has been lowered in the last 20 years, it is still common.

Causes

There are organizing processes that produce class, racial, and gender inequalities. Many inequalities occur because of implicit bias. Many people have argued that the women gain their social position from the men around them, such as their fathers and their husbands. This is because womanhood has, throughout history, been attributed to child bearing and raising a family. Employment, and the benefits that came with it, always came after their family life. In the workplace it is required that a worker shows up on time and works continuously for the entire workday, which usually consists of eight hours. Since women were responsible for raising children, they had much less time and flexibility to partake in full-time jobs, and thus women in the workforce were generally only seen in part-time positions.  This trend is part of what leads to modern-day inequality.

Inequality in education

As the occupational pipeline, the educational background and environment in which people develop profoundly shape the direction in which their career path will follow. Historically, there has been a significant gender imbalance in fields of study. Women have always dominated the humanities, while men have held a sizeable difference when it comes to science, technology, engineering, and mathematics (STEM) fields. Some of the primary factors leading to gender imbalances in collegiate fields of study include differences in pre-college preparation, personal preference for a field of study, and career prospects.

Getting a job: skills, networks, and discrimination

Role of socioeconomic status and human capital in building workforce skills sets
The American Workforce has become increasingly specialized in the last century developing from a mix of agricultural and industrial jobs to greater specialization among American workers. The growth of outsourcing of American jobs to countries such as China and other nations of Southeast Asia has been linked to the decline of employment opportunities for Americans from low-income, urban communities who once were the employee base for the American industrial sector. Over the last 15 years, however, the number of outsourced has increased by 23%. This development has had a significant effect on the employment prospects of certain sectors of the American population, most notably on those of low socio-economic status.

Skill-Based technical Change, as this shift in production and employment trends is called, favors the skilled worker over the unskilled worker and has been occasioned by the development of increasingly complex technologies, which both require more training of employees and, in some instances, can replace unskilled workers. The combination of increased specialization and digitalization and the outsourcing of jobs for unskilled workers have led to an increased need among American employees to invest in greater technical and intellectual skills building. This, however, proves difficult for those of low socioeconomic status, which has been shown to limit education, and, by extension, income and occupation.

Low socioeconomic status also correlates with an individual's human capital, defined by the Organization of Economic Cooperation and Development (OECD) as the "knowledge, skills, competencies and other attributes that are relevant to economic activity". The term capital-skill complementarity describes the close relationship that exists between access to human capital and skills development. The existence of this complementarity indicates that the socioeconomic status, by means of its direct effect on access to human capital, determines employee skill sets and employability.

Those from low-socioeconomic backgrounds have less access to resources as a result of unequal distribution of the resources, which contribute to greater community skill building. Higher socioeconomic status, by contrast, has been linked to access to greater high-quality connections, greater proficiency in technical skills like ordinal sequencing and ability to problem-solve.  Access to high-quality connections, in turn, is linked to greater social capital. Technical skills are a result of access to greater human capital which, when defined as access to knowledge and skill-building opportunities, is lacking in low SES communities. Gaps in the socioeconomic status of Americans have led to the current division of the American workforce into a base of low SES, unskilled workers and skilled employees who generally come from higher SES, highly educated backgrounds and are, therefore, more likely to attain the higher education necessary to enter the market for skilled workers. Members of low-SES communities lack access to the educational opportunities, which would enable them to develop the skills they need to advance economically and increase their employability in a skills-biased economy.

Existing disparities between socio-economic groups continue the perpetuation of a workforce divided into unskilled and skilled workers and ensures that low SES Americans will continue to lack the human capital they need to develop employable skills. Evidence from research conducted by the OECD shows that the skills-education gap has widened in Africa, South America, Eastern Europe and most developed OECD countries. Because skills facilitate the diffusion of technical knowledge and innovation and human capital is key to the individuals' ability to assimilate new technology and to develop institutional knowledge as well as to increase access to high-quality connections low SES has been shown to contribute to inequalities in skill building and thus depresses the employability of low-income Americans.

Skills and employment: job placement and employment trends

An integral part of anyone's ability to obtain a job lies in his or her skills and ability to perform that job successfully and efficiently. And beyond simply attaining a job, the skills they are able to acquire over time along with the skills they possessed previously also affect their wages once they have a job. However, it is difficult to discuss the role of skill in the workplace without discussing its relationship to racial and gender discrimination. The sections on discrimination will talk about more specifically about how the ability to get hired and the gaps in wages are affected by race and gender, but in the context of skill, the two relate in the context of educational opportunities and resources. In nationwide studies, skill supply can often be incorrectly measured because people assume that any standard level of educational achievement (such as high school graduate) should provide a common standard for skill; however, minorities that only have access to local, less academically rigorous schools are likely to be less skilled than whites that are at the same standard educational level. Furthermore, differences in wages between racial groups can be attributed to differences in skill that began during early education. According to human capital theory, there is a positive correlation between a worker's skill supply and their wage earnings. The more skilled the worker and the better they are at their job, the more they will get paid. There is also a correlation between skill and education, suggesting that the more educated a worker is, the more skilled they will be. Therefore, there will be wage gaps between racial groups because of the differences in education and therefore, skill.

Also concerning the role of education in acquiring skills, people are now required to receive more education and earn higher degrees in order to get jobs than they have in the past. For example, many nurses are now required to have a bachelor's degree in nursing in order to work, which increases the enrollment in nursing courses at four-year colleges, as well as forcing many to return to school in order to fulfill the requirements.
They have even opened programs for people who are already registered nurses, so that they can earn bachelor's degrees. Not only are workers having to earn more degrees to find jobs than before, but with the increasing role of new technology in the workplace, workers must be more specialized in their skills as well. We are entering an age of hyper-specialization, meaning that companies are now more frequently subdividing labor into complex networks of individual, specialized tasks. Because employers are looking for more specialized skill sets, people are required to develop more highly specialized skills. This makes it more difficult to find jobs, especially for older workers who are not as familiar with modern technology and specializing in specific skills. In the past, people have been able to have a more general skill set that encompasses many aspects of a business, but now they must be highly specialized in one or two specific skills. Although it remains consistent that the more skillful a worker is, the higher their wages will be, the role of skills in the workplace has transformed over time to require more education and more specialized skill, making it even more difficult to bridge the racial and gender wage and employment gaps. !

Introduction to discrimination

Discrimination is the unfair treatment of an individual based on different characteristics such as age, race, or sex. Title VII of the Civil Rights Act of 1964 specifically addresses protection against discrimination in regard to employment, outlawing employment discrimination of an individual "because of such individual's race, color, religion, sex, or national origin". With the passage of the Equal Employment Opportunity Act of 1972, the Equal Employment Opportunity Commission regulates the compliance to Title VII of employers with fifteen or more employees. The EEOC investigates and, if deemed necessary, files suit against employers who face charges of discrimination. A brief overview of the forms of discrimination the EEOC investigates shows the advances in equal opportunity legislation over the years.

Age discrimination outlaws unfair treatment of individuals who are age forty or older. Discrimination practices may include excessive harassment of an individual or limiting an individual's work opportunities based on their age. Disability discrimination policies protect individuals covered by the Americans with Disabilities Act or the Rehabilitation Act from unfair treatment. Policies require the employer to provide "reasonable accommodation" (example: wheelchair accessibility) for disabled individuals, unless the employer provides sufficient reasons for why changes would cause "undue hardship".

Equal pay and compensation policies state that employers must provide men and women in the same workplace equal pay (this includes all types of salary) for equal work. Based on content, the jobs must be "substantially" equal, but not necessarily identical.

Genetic information (including family medical history) must remain confidential information. Employers are prohibited from discriminating against an individual based on genetic information or requiring the disclosure of genetic information.

National origin policies prohibit discrimination against an individual because of their real or assumed ethnicity, accent, or geographic roots. These policies also protect against discrimination toward individuals associated with people from particular national origins or groups.

Pregnancy policies state that women who are temporarily unable to perform their regular duties at work due to pregnancy or childbirth must receive the same benefits and treatment that a temporarily disabled employee would receive. This may include such opportunities as unpaid leave, alternative work assignments, or disability leave.

Race/color discrimination includes the unfair treatment of an individual based on race, physical characteristics associated with certain races, or skin color. Policies protect spouses, and individuals affiliated with or belonging to race-based or color-associated organizations.
 
Religious discrimination policies protect all individuals "who have sincerely held religious, ethical or moral beliefs". Unless the employer proves it an undue hardship, dress and grooming accommodations, as well as reasonable adjustments to allow for the individual to practice their religion may be required.
 
Retaliation policies prohibit employers from retaliating against employees who have filed discrimination charges, complaints, or help with an investigation.

Sex discrimination policies protect individuals from facing unfair treatment because of their sex or their association with a sex-specific group or organization.

Sexual harassment laws protect individuals from, " sexual harassment' or unwelcome sexual advances, requests for sexual favors, and other verbal or physical harassment of a sexual nature ". Offensive comments also fall under sexual harassment and may result in legal charges.

More recently, groups have claimed reverse discrimination: as employers strive to reach affirmative action minority quota goals, majority group members may receive unfair treatment as a result. The EEOC regulates employer practices regardless of minority or majority status.

Discrimination in the workplace

Despite the anti-discrimination legislative measures taken, discrimination in the workplace is still a prevalent issue. Racial discrimination particularly remains problematic.

Networks: the mechanisms and advantages of professional connections

Complex networks are a core part basic employment and business practices that exist in our society today. More and more, people are using personal connections to find opportunities that would normally be found through job searches. These connections can be through an educational institution, friends, family members, and even networking websites like LinkedIn and Facebook. Networking is a somewhat recent phenomenon of using connections to foster new relationships and opportunities. There are two kinds of network ties: strong ties, which are connections with people who you have frequent and close interactions with, and weak ties, which are connections with people whom you have infrequent and sparse interactions with. However, the basic goal is to make as many connections you can and in every direction possible. Whether that is laterally, below you, and above you, it is beneficial to know people of all calibers.
Although the law prohibits employers from choosing not to hire some one based on an uncontrollable factor like race or gender, it is still very prominent in our society today. The Fourteenth Amendment, stating that all citizens be treated equally, has promoted and created equality in the work force, but it isn't able to offer everyone the same opportunities. Many people are born into lifestyles that don't give them the same opportunities that more fortunate people have, and these disadvantages are the cause of the inequality we still see today. Although socioeconomic factors play a huge role in these opportunities, a person's race and gender are equally responsible for the connections and opportunities they are presented with.

In her article, "Don't put my name on it," Sandra Smith, a sociologist at the University of California Berkeley, discusses the prevalence of discriminatory practices in our society today. She focuses on the African American population, and the limitations that burden them as a result of networking disadvantages. "From a social capital theoretical perspective, deficiencies in access to mainstream ties and institutions explain persistent joblessness among the black urban poor". The historical disadvantages that African Americans still face today are the reason for the lack of progression in networking. Regardless of true mental or physical capabilities, African Americans are disadvantaged when it comes to attaining a job, simply because they aren't part of the largely white networks that dominate our society today. It is difficult to meet the right people and find the right opportunities when our society subconsciously puts up barriers to them. "Instead, the inefficaciousness of job referral networks appears to have more to do with functional deficiencies (see Coleman and Hoffer 1987)—the disinclination of potential job contacts to assist when given the opportunity to do so, not because they lack information or the ability to influence hires, but because they perceive pervasive untrustworthiness among their job-seeking ties and choose not to assist," (3).

Networking, the idea of using connections to foster new relationships and opportunities should be an advantage to every member of our society. Laws that demand equal opportunity for everyone should also generate similar equality in the work force. However, historical discriminatory attitudes that continue to plague the country today are making it difficult for people of minorities to attain jobs, especially because of the significance of networking and the extent to which is generates success.

Gender pay gap 

The gender wage gap is the difference between average earnings for men and women. There are multiple theories for the reasons as to why this exists, but a large amount of the gender wage gap can be attributed to the fact that women work different jobs than men, as opposed to that women are paid differently within the same jobs or establishments.

In a study completed in 2005 it was found that working fathers are paid an 8.6% higher starting wage than working mothers.

Pay gap between mothers and non-mothers
It has also been found that there is a pay gap between mothers and non-mothers. "Mothers were recommended a 7.9% lower starting salary than non-mothers" (Correll and Bernard 2005)

Returning to work 
When women return to work after maternity leave they can feel uncertain about where they stand. "According to figures analysed by the House of Commons library, 14 per cent of the 340,000 women who take maternity leave each year find their jobs under threat, when they try to return to work.”. (Fairley 2013)

Career experiences: gender inequality in the workplace

Tokenism
Tokenism is an extremely common practice in the workplace environment of today; it can essentially be defined as the act of going out of one's way to include members of minority groups. According to Rosabeth Kanter's 1977 publication Men and Women of the Corporation, the inability to achieve equality within the workplace can be largely attributed to the placement of "token status" on certain groups of individuals. Oftentimes tokens possess marginal status as members who are allowed entrance but do not get to experience full participation due to their status as an "outsider" who may be fully qualified for the position but does not possess the necessary characteristics, i.e. sex or race, that are usually expected of persons in said position. 
The term token can also be used to describe people who are hired due to their difference from other members of the company or other employees: oftentimes this is done as an attempt to prove that the group does not discriminate against said group of people. This variety of tokenism is thought to have originated in the Southern United States, where schools and businesses would admit token African Americans in order to meet the desegregation orders of the federal government. In many instances, the number of tokens accepted into a group or company is less than the number of people from the token group who are qualified for acceptance. However, in some cases, tokens are people who do not possess the necessary qualifications to hold a position but are admitted because of their token status.

An individual who possesses token status can have a very affected career experience. Kanter hypothesizes that oftentimes, the token's experience is less related to whatever attribute makes them a token and more so influenced by the structural restraints that are intrinsic to the positions they fill. To elaborate, the positions held by tokens are generally lacking in power and the opportunity for advancement. Additionally, tokens operating within workplaces with skewed ratios that result in them being extremely outnumbered are "often treated as representations of their category, as symbols rather than individuals". Tokens are also extremely visible and subject to scrutiny due to their evident contrast from the majority. This can create large amounts of pressure to perform well; tokens will often either respond to this with overachievement or underachievement, both of which make further advancement difficult. More often than not, token status often leads to "demotivation, lower levels of performance, and diminished aspirations for the future".

Many solutions to the problem of tokenism have been suggested; though a balanced work force will not eliminate all of the issues faced by tokens in the workplace, movement towards balance will help open the doors to some improvement. However, balancing the numbers and ratios is not necessarily the biggest issue at hand: many researchers suggest that power, privilege, and prestige are more important factors in the relationship between dominant and secondary groups in the workplace. Many believe that as the proportions of minority and majority workers balance out, tension within the workplace is actually more likely to increase rather than decrease. Though this may be true, the theory that increasing the proportions of the token groups would alleviate the issue should not be in any way discounted. This solution could possibly "reduce the isolation and effects of tokenism, improve token's position in the power structure of the department, and also increase their opportunities". Another solution could be to increase the number of tokens in managerial positions and to apply new policies of hiring and promotion; this affirmative action could work to give tokens the confidence they need to become full participants in the workplace rather than just representations of their category or token attribute.

The "double bind" for female workers
People's career experiences are largely affected by how they are viewed by their coworkers, and the way employees' actions are perceived may vary based on gender due to the existence of a "double bind" for women. Social scientist Gregory Bateson described the general concept of a double bind as "a situation in which no matter what a person does, he 'can't win.'" If individuals are instructed or expected to act in contradictory ways, then they are caught in a double bind because no action they choose will be determined acceptable.

Most men do not have difficulty reconciling their gender with expectations as an employee, for "definitions of ideal workers as those who are completely dedicated to their work, without career interruptions or outside responsibilities, privilege male workers." Additionally, being confident and assertive reflects positive traits for both men and leaders. Women, on the other hand, are compared to stereotypes about passive femininity that mean if they are assertive, they are viewed as acting in conflict with their internal nature and criticized. More generally, "when women act in ways that are consistent with gender stereotypes, they are viewed as less competent leaders," but "when women act in ways that are inconsistent with such stereotypes, they're considered as unfeminine."  This represents a double bind because both perceptions paint women in a negative light.

How women choose to react to this double bind situation will affect their experience in the workplace. For example, while women who act stereotypically masculine "might be viewed as competent because of their leadership style, they also receive more negative evaluations of their interpersonal skills than women who adopt a 'feminine' style" and "not being liked can […] negatively impact women's work relationships, access to social networks, day-to-day interactions and, ultimately, their advancement opportunities." As some industries, such as Wall St. firms, rely on peer evaluations to determine pay, promotion, and more generally assess a worker's contribution and worth, how women are perceived will affect their career experiences. Additionally, women who are continually passed over for advancement may choose to leave rather than stay and feel undervalued.

Sociologists have specifically studied how the idea of the ideal worker clashes with the view of women as mothers or potential mothers. For example, Catherine Turco explored the leverage buyout (LBO) industry and determined that "by casting the ideal investor as one who puts commitment to work above all else, the LBO image implicitly specifies another social role—that of mother—as mutually incompatible with the occupational role." Similarly, lab experiments and audit studies found that a "motherhood penalty" exists that can negatively affect wages and performance evaluations. Moreover, negative views of mothers working may be expanded to non-mothers and even those who are unmarried because "all women [may be viewed] as potential mothers." This may be due to cultural assumptions that women will leave work when they have children, thus causing other workers and managers to view them as less committed, even if they have expressed that this is not their plan. The double bind here exists because even if women try to present themselves as serious workers, their role as mothers or their ability to become pregnant causes employers to treat them differently. As women are being judged by virtue of being female, institutional norms about what it means to be a good worker must be changed to remove the double bind experienced by women.

Gay, lesbian, bisexual, and transgender workplace inequality
Since the Stonewall riots of 1969, the visibility and acceptance of gay, lesbian, bisexual, and transgender (GLBT) employees in corporate America has steadily been on the rise; the first gay employee network appeared in 1978, and in 1991, the first Fortune 1000 company offered domestic-partner health benefits to its employees.  Today, the majority of Fortune 500 companies offer both sexual orientation and gender identity protections, as well as domestic-partner health benefits.  The rapid increase in queer workplace equality can be attributed to a number of factors, most notably isomorphism.

Mimetic pressures, in which competing firms model the procedures of competitors, are especially visible in the adoption of domestic-partner benefits.  For instance, after Wells Fargo and Bank of America adopted domestic-partner benefits in 1998, other banks, like Bankers Trust and Chase, soon followed voluntarily.  These mimetic pressures are still visible today; in 2002, just two percent of Fortune 500 companies included gender identity in their non-discrimination policies, while in 2012, 57 percent of companies do so.  
Much like these mimetic pressures, normative isomorphism, which stems from the professionalization of a practice, also helped diffuse equitable benefits. A 1991 Forbes story, "Gay in Corporate America", "broke the longstanding silence of the business press regarding gay and lesbian issues", beginning an important trend; diversity consultants and human resource professionals concluded through the 1990s that "inclusion equals performance".
Though much progress has been made in the area of same-sex benefits, GLBT employees continue to face challenges in the workplace that their non-queer coworkers do not.  According to a 2009 survey, 58 percent of GLBT employees say coworkers make jokes or derogatory comments about GLBT people "at least once in a while".

But perhaps the single greatest contributor to the GLBT experience in the workplace is the decision of employees to come out or remain closeted at work. Brian McNaught, a lauded leader of gay sensitivity training, explained the pressures that surround a decision, noting that "gay people who have to worry about what will happen to them if they come out […] generally produce at a lower level than gay employees who don't" as it takes much energy to "put on a mask"; 54 percent of closeted employees report "lying about their personal lives in the past twelve months".  Non-GLBT employees are never required to make the conscious decision to share or hide the details of their personal lives, while GLBT employees make that very decision daily. Even with the added stress of the "mask", a 2009 survey concluded 51 percent of GLBT employees report hiding their GLBT identity to those at work.

These unique experiences have compounded to create significant concrete inequalities for GLBT workers in today's workplaces.  For queer employees, there is an undeniable "pink ceiling"; not a single Fortune 1000 CEO is openly gay, and it is documented that being gay negatively impacts an employee's opportunity for promotion – 28 percent of gay employees remain closeted "because they feel it may be an obstacle to career advancement or development opportunities".  Some of these fears are well founded; only 21 states and the District of Columbia currently have employment laws prohibiting discrimination based on sexual orientation – in many states it is thus perfectly legal to fire an employee for being gay. In 2020, the US Supreme Court ruled that the 1964 Civil Rights Act protects gay, lesbian, and transgender employees from discrimination based on sex. However, the federal law still did not protect LGBT employees from being fired based on their sexual orientation or gender identity in businesses of 15 workers or less.  

In addition to these challenges, transgender employees in particular also face many more. Though courts recently concluded that transgenderism is a protected class under Title VII of the Civil Rights Act of 1964, most notably in Smith v. City of Salem in 2004, courts still allow gender-specific dress and grooming codes, and are legally able to reject exemptions for transgender employees  ; transgender employees thus often face the very difficult choice of complying with the dress code or dressing in the gender they present and potentially losing their jobs. For queer employees, workplace inequality thus remains a fact of life.

Inequality in the financial field

The glass ceiling
The Wall Street Journal came up with the term "the glass ceiling" to describe the barriers that women face in efforts to get promoted to top-tier positions within their corporations. Despite their qualifications (women constitute 58% of all university graduates), women make up less than 8% of the top corporate-level positions. Although many firms employ diversity programs aimed at reaching greater number of women in the field, women are still not reaching the top levels within their companies at the same rates as men. Many major investment banks in particular try to hire women whenever possible (refer to tokenism section). Recruiters, however, still inherently use statistical generalization: the stereotypical woman is more likely to leave her position sooner than a man due to family-related reasons means that women inherently face greater challenges to promotion when the opportunity arise.

The corporate culture
Financial rewards often play a huge role in people's decisions to enter and stay in corporate firms, but their experiences there often explain why they left. The "up-or-out" system prevalent in many consulting firms can help to explain the male-dominated hierarchy; for women who require maternity leave their roles cannot be sustained in such an environment. While numerous firms support formal internal diversity initiatives, women are often also excluded from the informal networks that men partake in outside of the office, activities that revolve around a "jock-talk" atmosphere which bonds the men and helps create connections that are important when promotions become available. 
Moreover, many Wall Street corporations are deeply rooted in their beliefs concerning gender norms and are said to cultivate machismo. In general, employees of professional firms tended toward homophily preferences, where they were drawn to coworkers similar to themselves. Thus, on Wall Street, just being a white, male junior colleague may to give you an advantage in promotional opportunities. At the same time, these practices also isolated those in the minority who felt a lack of support from their peers and superiors. In efforts to combat such prevailing culture, Wall Street firms have implemented equal opportunity guidelines, followed class action suits, placed diversity initiatives, and created grievance procedures.

Access: barriers and advantages
A preference for coworkers of similar features to oneself meant that managers often specifically selected individuals to share accounts and deals with; many times, this meant disadvantaging women and minorities for account allocations, performance evaluations and relative compensation. Connections made through informal networks often advantaged those individuals with better access to clients, accounts, and deals. Often, women are driven to switch fields within the business sector, for example from corporate finance to equity research, from heavily male-dominated to those that are more gender neutral. Such trade may result in substantial pay cuts, as the median earning in the new sector can be much lower than the median income in the old sector. 
Moreover, mentorship can play an important role in one's experiences at a workplace. Many firms have formal mentorship programs to guide promising new junior employees. In cases where the mentorship starts informally (the senior partner does so without company dictation to do so) some junior employees will inherently have the advantage over their peers. This can often end disastrously for workers who are outside of the informal networks that can start such ties. On Wall Street specifically, there were many male senior executives who were committed to encouraging success from women junior executives, with 65% of women who had mentors noting their mentors were male.

Inequality in STEM fields
In 2019, women accounted for 27% of workers in STEM-qualified fields, and earned almost 20% less than men in the same industries. The number of women in STEM changed minutely in 2021, as the percentage went up to 28%.  In the workplaces themselves, gender inequalities manifest in a multitude of different ways. Varying workplace experiences among men and women can be attributed to differences in communication styles and social norms in the industry. Because STEM fields are so dominated by men, women working in these industries are often expected to act more masculine to be taken seriously. Furthermore, the lack of women steers the culture and social norms within many of these industries to become more "masculine" and therefore, many women don't have others to model themselves after and as a result feel that they have to change in order to "fit in".

Communication
In STEM industries, meetings and technical discussions are often very knowledge and experience based. In these settings, people with more dominant – and often perceived to be "masculine" – personas tend to drive and overpower the conversation because they sound more knowledgeable on a certain topic. This way of communication, often correlated with self-promotion, can put men and people with more masculine personas at an advantage because "self-promotion is a stereotypically masculine communication style involving aggressive displays of confidence that assert one's own superiority". And even though "women's abilities to successfully self-promote are often inhibited by fear of backlash or social sanctions for counterstereotypical behavior", women in technology often feel the need to be more masculine to have their voice heard.

Another way this manifests itself is in varying communication styles. A person with a "competitive communication style" may frequently interrupt others as a way of showing dominance. Studies have shown that interruptions are associated with masculinity as a meta-analysis of 43 studies found that men make more intrusive interruptions than women do. Therefore, because women are often more likely than men to be the ones interrupted, it causes women to feel inferior during a discussion. This leads to women feeling less competent in their technical abilities, and decreased productivity as they begin to feel like their opinions don't matter as much, leading to a negative work environment.

Social factors
Another factor that creates the difference in experience for men and women in STEM fields is the social climate. The idea of the "old boy culture" is very much pertinent in male-dominated STEM fields where women find it difficult to fit in. Furthermore, female role models and mentors are rare for young women in these industries. Because mentors are very important in aiding in career development as well as building self-esteem in the workplace, the lack of female mentors inhibits the growth and success of women in STEM workplaces. These social factors lead to an environment that may not be inclusive towards women because women feel like they need to be "one of the boys" in order to be included.

Because of these social factors and the communication differences between men and women, the experience for women in STEM fields varies greatly from that of women in more gender-balanced or female-dominated industries.

Work and family

Inequality in household work and childcare

Beginning in the 1960s, the U.S. began to experience a significant change in the family division of labor. During the past several decades, the contributions of men to household tasks have risen considerably, increasing from about 15% to over 30% of the total housework, whereas the average daily contribution of working, married mothers has decreased by 2 hours. Despite these changes, there are still inequalities in the distribution of childcare and housework between men and women. Here we discuss several work-family ideologies, the ideology promoted by most American institutions, explanations for why this is the prevailing ideology, and implications of the resulting gendered division of labor.

Generally, the way in which labor is divided in the home is reflective of the work-family ideologies to which the husband and wife individually subscribe. Mary Blair-Loy identifies three of these ideologies: traditional, egalitarian, and transitional. The traditional family arrangement is the breadwinner-homemaker model of the 1950s in which women are expected to fully devote themselves to household management and childcare, while their husband's earn the family income. The egalitarian arrangement entails that the husband and wife be equally active at home and in the workforce. The transitional arrangement allows for both husband and wife to be engaged in the workforce, with the wife taking on the bulk of the homemaking responsibilities. Sociologist Arlie Hochschild calls the additional time spent on housework "the second shift" for women. Families that adopt the transitional arrangement often utilize full-time, paid childcare because the work of both parents demands long hours, even if the wife works only part-time.

Although individuals subscribe to varying work-family ideologies, American institutions reflect a gendered division of labor that encourages women to be active in the domestic sphere and men in the workforce. There is a stigma associated with women working full-time, especially if they are married or have children, whereas men are expected to work full-time. These gender norms are particularly evident on Wall Street where men and women view either the breadwinner-homemaker model or full-time hired childcare as the answer if they choose to have children. Stay-at-home wives enable men to devote their time and energy to their careers. Even outside of Wall Street, many modern organizations assume that most families employ a traditional ideology although, statistically, this is no longer the norm.

A number of explanations have been posited for the existence of a gendered division of labor. Gary Becker theorizes that women are more likely to leave the labor force or work part-time because they have a lower earning potential than men. Thus, it makes sense economically for men to focus on their careers if the family's aim is to maximize income and provide adequate childcare. There is some support for Becker's assertion. After all, men's earnings increase and women's decrease when they have children. However, equally plausible is the argument that these trends result from the cultural norms that sway potentially high-earning women toward home rather than toward work. An additional explanation is that some women simply enjoy and believe that they are well-suited for family caregiving.

The differential distribution of household work has significant implications. For example, most married mothers become economically dependent on their husbands, but the law does not grant them financial equality in marriage. This means that, in the case of divorce, mothers experience a dramatic drop in income. Moreover, the social safety net does not protect divorced or single mothers from poverty, and mothers are not eligible for unemployment insurance if they work part-time or at home. Clearly, the unequal distribution of housework and childcare has meaningful implications and warrants some discussion.

The family factor, especially for married women, is one of the reasons that leads to more mobile inclination for women than men in job market. The stereotype forces married women to undertake more family responsibilities than men, so women have no choice but to relocate workplaces for fulfilling the family needs. Compared with men who have more freedom to decide their workplaces, to move frequently in working system is obvious a disadvantage for women to improve their positions or to earn more income. On the other hand, men are more willing to relocate workplaces when their wives have better income, but not their wives' careers themselves, which means the power in family can also be transferred through women create more economic value than their husbands. This is the progress for women to develop their careers in recent years. Another source describes the variety of women's careers in their lifetime as "snake-like", meaning they move from job to job through their whole career lives flexibly. Compared with challenge of flexibility, this research provides a new idea that some women actually gain benefits by developing their own business to fulfill family needs.

Alternative family styles in relation to childcare and career experiences
The structure of today's family has evolved over the past decades from the "traditional" married, heterosexual couple to an increasing number of alternative family lifestyles.  Non-traditional family units can include single-parent families, families with one biological parent and a step-parent, blended families, gay marriage families, and families where parents are absent and grandparents or other relatives take over parental roles. While all these non-traditional family lifestyles might present social challenges for the children as well as create undesirable career experiences, the two units that warrant the most consideration are the single-mother and same-sex partner lifestyles.

There are a number of ways that women become single mothers: divorce, outside marriage births, and partner death. Only recently did the United States see a spike in outside marriage births as well as divorce rates. In 30 years, the percentage of outside births has gone from under 20% to around 41%, with divorce rates being around 50%.  Divorce rates peaked in 1980, at about 40% for first marriages; by the early 2000s the percentage had dropped to around 30%. Although the number of divorces is decreasing, they along with outside marriage births account for the growing single-mother population.

Single mothers are faced with a number of challenges primarily resulting from low income. On average, single parents account for between 15 and 40% of income inequality, earning an estimated average of $32,597, less than half of what the average married couple earns. Women's incomes on average are lower than men's due to "occupational segregation". These statistics indicate that a vast number of single-parent children grow up in poverty. Studies have shown children growing up in poverty are 66% less likely to rise out of poverty. Single mothers, although working long strenuous hours at these low-paying jobs, are still unable to cope with the financial burden of childcare. With the burden of single-motherhood becoming more and more of a prevalent issue, one would think that it would begin to be taken into serious consideration by the public. However, progress toward gender integration has slowed, childcare expenses are on the rise, housing isn't getting any cheaper and health care is still expensive.

Homosexuals have faced much harassment as well as segregation in the workforce community. Individuals of different sexual orientations have been criticized, segregated and physically harassed for decades even within the labor community, a place which being homosexual should not reflect upon how well one performs a job. In fact, "studies have shown that anywhere from 15 percent to 43 percent of gay people have experienced some form of discrimination and harassment in the workplace".  Discrimination and social stigmas can stymie a gay worker's upward mobility within the workforce, causing inequity in pay and advancement.

See also
 Gender equality
 Gender inequality
 Gender polarization
 Gender pay gap in the United States
Menopause in the workplace
 Racial equality
 Racism
 Occupational sexism
 Social stratification
 Sexual harassment in the workplace in the United States
 Motherhood penalty

References

Occupations

Social inequality
Workplace